A Bou bhat (  lit: "bride feast") is a post-wedding ritual held usually one or two days after a Bengali wedding. In this ceremony a party is hosted by the groom's father or family, where both the bride's and groom's family members and friends are invited. A grand banquet is held at the end of the party which is called Preetibhoj or Preetibhoja and is similar to a gala dinner. In Bengali Muslim wedding after the bou bhat party, the bride and groom go to the bride's family's house for two nights. On the second day, the groom's family is invited to the bride's house for a meal, and they leave with the bride and groom. This meal is called firani or araiya. Shopping is done by the groom for this meal.

In a bou bhat ceremony, bride wears a traditional shari given either by her father or in-laws, while the groom wears a traditional dhoti or shalwar and pair with kurta or sherwani given to him by his in-laws.

The ritual varies from one place to another. In some places, the bride has her first meal in the home of her in-laws during this ceremony. Until bou bhat, her meals usually arrive from a neighbour's house. While in some parts, like in eastern Comilla, firani is held after eight days, called at naiyor.

References 

Bangladeshi wedding traditions
Bengali culture
Indian wedding traditions